Christopher Carter (born 9 September 1997) is a Hong Kong former cricketer. He made his first-class debut for Hong Kong against the United Arab Emirates in the 2015–17 ICC Intercontinental Cup tournament on 11 November 2015. He made his One Day International debut for Hong Kong against the United Arab Emirates in the 2015–17 ICC World Cricket League Championship on 16 November 2015. He made his Twenty20 International debut for Hong Kong against Oman on 21 November 2015.

In August 2018, he was named in Hong Kong's squad for the 2018 Asia Cup Qualifier tournament. Hong Kong won the qualifier tournament, and he was then named in Hong Kong's squad for the 2018 Asia Cup.

In October 2018, Carter announced that he was quitting international cricket to become a pilot in Australia.

References

External links
 

1997 births
Living people
Hong Kong cricketers
Hong Kong One Day International cricketers
Hong Kong Twenty20 International cricketers
Wicket-keepers